The Lattice Boltzmann methods for solids (LBMS) are a set of methods for solving partial differential equations (PDE) in solid mechanics. The methods use a discretization of the Boltzmann equation(BM), and their use is known as the lattice Boltzmann methods for solids.

LBMS methods are categorized by their reliance on:

 Vectorial distributions
 Wave solvers
 Force tuning

The LBMS subset remains highly challenging from a computational aspect as much as from a theoretical point of view. Solving solid equations within the LBM framework is still a very active area of research. If solids are solved, this shows that the Boltzmann equation is capable of describing solid motions as well as fluids and gases: thus unlocking complex physics to be solved such as fluid-structure interaction (FSI) in biomechanics.

Proposed insights

Vectorial distributions 
The first attempt of LBMS tried to use a Boltzmann-like equation for force (vectorial) distributions. The approach requires more computational memory but results are obtained in fracture and solid cracking.

Wave solvers 
Another approach consists in using LBM as acoustic solvers to capture waves propagation in solids.

Force tuning

Introduction 
This idea consists of introducing a modified version of the forcing term: (or equilibrium distribution) into the LBM as a stress divergence force. This force is considered space-time dependent and contains solid properties

,

The stress tensor is usually computed across the lattice aiming finite difference schemes.

Some results 

Force tuning has recently proven its efficiency with a maximum error of 5% in comparison with standard finite element solvers in mechanics. Accurate validation of results can also be a tedious task since these methods are very different, common issues are:

 Meshes or lattice discretization
 Location of computed fields at elements or nodes
 Hidden information in softwares used for finite element analysis comparison
 Non-linear materials
 Steady state convergence for LBMS

Notes

References 

Biomechanics
Fluid dynamics
Thermodynamics